Bryan Little (born 18 May 1978) is a Scottish footballer.

Club career
He began his career in Scotland with Berwick Rangers, before spending time in New Zealand with Miramar Rangers, Team Wellington and Auckland City.

Coaching Career 
After retiring from playing, Little pursued a career in coaching. He held the role of Director of Coaching & Head Soccer Coach at Almaden Valley Soccer in San Jose, CA. After this role, he moved on to be the Head Coach of Westminster High School in Westminster, Colorado, a post he held for 4 seasons.

External links
Player profile at the Portland Timbers
 2008/2009 season stats – NZFC
 NZFC stats – Team Wellington

1978 births
Living people
Association football midfielders
Scottish footballers
Scottish expatriate footballers
Scottish expatriate sportspeople in New Zealand
Scottish expatriate sportspeople in the United States
Berwick Rangers F.C. players
Auckland City FC players
Portland Timbers (2001–2010) players
USL First Division players
Expatriate association footballers in New Zealand
Expatriate soccer players in the United States
Team Wellington players